Cetengraulis is a genus of anchovies. It currently contains two species.

Species
 Cetengraulis edentulus (Cuvier, 1829) (Atlantic anchoveta)
 Cetengraulis mysticetus (Günther, 1867) (Pacific anchoveta)

References
 

Anchovies
Marine fish genera
Taxa named by Albert Günther